Detectives is a 1928 silent film comedy produced and distributed by Metro-Goldwyn-Mayer. It was directed by Chester Franklin with elements of the old-house melodrama genre. The film is another outing for Karl Dane, George K. Arthur and Marceline Day. Clips of the film appeared in Robert Youngson's MGM's Big Parade of Comedy in 1965. One scene has George K. Arthur disappearing while within the hanging covers of a large canopy bed.

The film is preserved by MGM. A trailer is preserved in the Library of Congress collection.

Cast
Karl Dane as The House Detective
George K. Arthur as The Bellhop
Marceline Day as Lois
Tenen Holtz as Orloff
Felecia Drenova as Mrs. Winters
Tetsu Komai as Chin Lee
Clinton Lyle as Roberts

References

External links

Detectives-trailer available for free download at Internet Archive

1928 films
American silent feature films
Metro-Goldwyn-Mayer films
Films based on short fiction
1928 comedy films
Silent American comedy films
Films directed by Chester Franklin
American black-and-white films
Films with screenplays by Robert Lord (screenwriter)
1920s American films